Central American Championships may refer to:

Central American Handball Championship
Central American Championships in Athletics
Central American Junior and Youth Championships in Athletics
Centrobasket

See also 

 Championship
 World championship
 African Championship
 Asian Championship
 European Championship
 Oceanian Championship
 Pan American Championship
 North American Championship